Revishvili may refer to:

 Amiran Revishvili (born 1956), Georgian cardiac surgeon and electrophysiologist
 Irakli Revishvili (born 1989), Georgian swimmer
 Nukri Revishvili (born 1987), Georgian footballer
 Zaza Revishvili (born 1968), Georgian footballer